is a railway station on the Chuo Main Line in Suwa, Nagano, Japan, operated by East Japan Railway Company (JR East).

Lines
It is located 201.9 kilometers from Tokyo Station.

Station layout
The station has one side platform and one island platform serving three tracks. The station has a "Midori no Madoguchi" staffed ticket office and a View Plaza travel agency.

Platforms

History
The station opened on 25 November 1905. With the privatization of Japanese National Railways (JNR) on 1 April 1987, the station came under the control of JR East.

Passenger statistics
In fiscal 2017, the station was used by an average of 4,367 passengers daily (boarding passengers only). The passenger figures for previous years are as shown below.

Surrounding area
 Lake Suwa

See also
 List of railway stations in Japan

References

External links

JR East station information 

Railway stations in Japan opened in 1905
Railway stations in Nagano Prefecture
Chūō Main Line
Stations of East Japan Railway Company
Suwa, Nagano